The Magee Farm, also known as the Jacob Magee House, is a historic residence in Kushla, Alabama, United States.  Built by Jacob Magee in 1848, the -story wood-frame structure is an example of the Gulf Coast Cottage style.  The house is best known as the site of preliminary arrangements for the surrender of the last Confederate States Army east of the Mississippi River.  Confederate General Richard Taylor negotiated a ceasefire with Union General Edward Canby at the house on April 29, 1865.  Taylor's forces, comprising 47,000 Confederate troops serving in Alabama, Mississippi and Louisiana, were the last remaining Confederate force east of the Mississippi River.  The Magee Farm was placed on the National Register of Historic Places on February 11, 1988.  In 2004, partially through the efforts of the Civil War Trust, a division of the American Battlefield Trust, which helped save 12.6 acres of the farm, the house was opened as a museum.  It ceased operation as a museum in 2010, due to a lack of public support and declining revenues, and was listed for sale.  It was then listed on the Alabama Historical Commission's Places in Peril listing for 2010.

See also
Battle of Spanish Fort
Battle of Fort Blakely
Mobile, Alabama in the American Civil War

References

Houses on the National Register of Historic Places in Alabama
Houses completed in 1848
National Register of Historic Places in Mobile County, Alabama
Houses in Mobile County, Alabama
Gulf Coast cottage architecture in Alabama
Alabama in the American Civil War
Defunct museums in Alabama